Puthuppally may refer to

 Puthuppally, Alappuzha, Kerala, India
 Puthuppally, Kottayam, Kerala, India